Jess Richards (23 January 1943 – 6 November 1994), born Richard Sederholm, was a Broadway actor as well as performing in many off Broadway shows.  He received the Theatre World Award for best actor in a musical for his performance in On the Town in 1971.

Biography
Born Richard Sederholm in 1943, he received a degree in acting from the University of Washington.  He was the brother of director and theatre academic Jack Paul Sederholm.

Richards made his Broadway debut in 1966 in Walking Happy, and among his other Broadway credits were roles in Barnum (1980), Blood Red Roses (1970), Mack & Mabel (1974), and Meet Me in St. Louis (1989). His 1971 performance in the musical On The Town won him a Theatre World Award.

He died as a result of AIDS in Indianapolis, Indiana, in 6 November 1994, aged 51.

Awards and nominations

References

External links 
 New York Times Obituary
 Jess Richards papers, 1943-1994, held by the Billy Rose Theatre Division, New York Public Library for the Performing Arts

1994 deaths
University of Washington School of Drama alumni
American male stage actors
20th-century American male actors
1943 births
AIDS-related deaths in Indiana